Folklore of the Luo peoples of Kenya speaks of a mighty warrior known as Luanda Magere. He was born in the year 1720 to Abonyo Wuod Omolo and mother Nyabera. His mother died during his birth so he was taken care of by his grandmother Rapondi. 
His father died in one of the numerous wars with their Nandi neighbours when Magere was barely a teenager. 
He belonged to the Sidho clan in Kano, in the shores of the Lake Victoria. The Sidho clan occupies the present sugar belt at the foot of the Nandi escarpment. He was possessed of unearthly powers, and his flesh was made of stone. Arrows, spears and clubs simply deflected from his body, making him invincible during war. He was famously known for his capability to tear an entire army apart alone.

Story
The Luo traditional enemies at the time were the jo Lang'o (the Luo name for the Kalenjin community). The Lang'o were tired of being defeated at war by the Luo. The Nandi elders sat to discuss the issue and came to a conclusion where they would give Luanda Magere the woman Maryann to marry, claiming that it was a gesture of peace. Maryann's role was to find out how to defeat him. Though the Luo elders advised him not to marry her, Luanda Magere did not heed their advice. 

Whenever Luanda was sick, his first wife would care for him. One day he fell ill when his first wife was away. He therefore called his Lang'o wife to bring him some medicine. Luanda instructed her to cut his shadow with a knife and instill the medicine. She was surprised when she saw his shadow bleed. That night, she crept out of Lwanda's home ran back to her people and told them her husband's weakness.

They then attacked the Luo. The Luo fought fiercely and Luanda killed so many Nandi warriors that they decided to retreat. As they were running, one Nandi warrior remembered that Luanda's strength was in his shadow. He stood at a hill and threw his spear at Luanda's shadow. Luanda Magere fell down and died. His body turned to stone.

Legacy
A site in Sidho with a stone is still revered as the spot where Luanda Magere died and people come from far and wide to conduct rituals and prayers at the site. Luanda Magere is still celebrated among the Luo through song and dance.

References

1. An anthropology from Gabriel Mboche Obute (son of the soil; from Kano Kobura, West Kochieng,, Migingo village) 

African folklore